USCGC Fir (WLB-213) is a Juniper-class cutter of the United States Coast Guard. USCGC Fir is under the Operational Control (OPCON) of the Commander of the Thirteenth Coast Guard District and is homeported in Astoria, Oregon. Fir's primary area of responsibility is the coastal waters, river bars and high seas of the Washingtonian and Oregonian coasts. USCGC Fir conducts heavy lift aids to navigation operations, law enforcement and other missions as directed.

Construction and characteristics
USCGC Fir was built by the Marinette Marine Corporation in Wisconsin, launched on 18 August 2003 and commissioned on 8 November 2003. Fir is propelled by two Caterpillar diesel engines rated at 3,100 horsepower, and has a top speed of 16 knots. She has a single controllable-pitch propeller, which along with bow and stern thrusters, allow the ship to be maneuvered to set buoys close offshore and in restricted waters. A dynamic global positioning system coupled with machinery plant controls and a chart display and information system allow station-keeping of the ship with an accuracy of within five meters of the planned position without human intervention. Fir is also equipped with an oil-skimming system known as the Spilled Oil Recovery System (SORS), which is used in her mission of maritime environmental protection. The cutter has a 2,875 square foot buoy deck area with a crane that is used for servicing large ocean buoys.

Fir is equipped with a dynamic positioning system that utilizes a bow thruster, stern truster and the ship's controllable pitch propeller to hold the ship's position and heading at the push of a button. The dynamic positioning system relies on inputs from the Differential Global Positioning System. In dynamic positioning mode the ship can be driven with a joystick from several locations on the bridge, and from a mobile ship control console.

The ship recently converted all of its lighted aids to navigation from incandescent to LED lights. Fir is the first unit in the U.S. Coast Guard to do so.

As a heavy lift platform Fir has a 20-ton hydraulic crane, a chain in-haul system and 4 heavy cross-deck winches. Fir carries two small boats; a cutter boat large (CB-L), specifically designed for law enforcement, and a C.G. Standard Utility Boat (UTL).

Fir is armed with several .50 caliber heavy machine guns, M240 light machine guns, and other small arms for law enforcement and defense operations. In accordance with United States and international law, Fir is considered an American warship.

Missions
Fir, a seagoing buoy tender, is responsible for over 150 aids to navigation for an area of responsibility that stretches from the Oregon-California border to the Canada–US border and includes the dangerous river bars of the Pacific Northwest. Fir also conducts extensive law enforcement operations, and is always ready to perform port waterways and coastal security, search and rescue, and marine environmental response operations.

History
Fir is named after one of the original lighthouse tenders built for the Lighthouse Service to resupply lighthouses and lightships, and to service buoys. The original  was built by the Moore Drydock Company in Oakland, California in 1939.  After serving as a truly multi-mission platform, adapting to the changing missions of the Coast Guard for over 50 years, Fir was decommissioned in 1991.

In May 2009, Fir was on scene commander for a plane crash in the Columbia River. Working with a local salvage crew, Fir recovered the airplane. Both passengers were rescued by the Columbia River Bar Pilots.

From June to October 2010, Fir was deployed to the Gulf of Mexico for Operation Deepwater Horizon. In total, eight of the Coast Guard's sixteen Juniper-class buoy tenders were deployed to the Gulf of Mexico for the nation's largest ever oil spill to conduct oil skimming operations, command and control and public relations.

Awards and honors
US Coast Guard E Ribbon for the period of 7 February to 4 March 2005, at Fleet Training Group (FTG) San Diego California.

US Coast Guard E Ribbon for the period of 29 October to 16 November 2007, at Fleet Training Group (FTG) San Diego California.

US Coast Guard E Ribbon for the period of 4 February 2012 to 19 November 2014, at Afloat Training Organization (ATO) Everett, Washington.

See also

 USCG seagoing buoy tender

Notes
Citations

References used

 
 
 
 

Juniper-class seagoing buoy tenders
Ships of the United States Coast Guard
2003 ships
Ships built by Marinette Marine